Sufasar was a Roman town, one of many in Roman North Africa.
Sufasar faded with the Muslim conquest of the Maghreb. The site has been tentatively identified with ruins at Amourah in modern Algeria.

Sufasar was also the seat, of an ancient bishopric, Metropolitan of Caesarea Mauretaniae (modern Cherchell).

Its bishop, Urbanus, was one of the Catholic bishops whom the Arian Vandal king Huneric summoned to a conference in Carthage in 484 and then exiled.

References

Archaeological sites in Algeria
Catholic titular sees in Africa
Roman towns and cities in Mauretania Caesariensis
Ancient Berber cities